Skok  (Cyrillic: Скок) is a Slovenian, Croatian, Belarusian, Ukrainian and Russian surname derived from the Slavic word skok for "leap, jump" or more precisely the Slovene word skočiti for "to jump, to leap" that has its highest density in Slovenia, where it was used in the 15th and 16th century as a nickname for a Christian refugee from the Turks who had fled the territories conquered by the Ottoman Empire to the southeast.
Notable people with the name Skok include:
Craig Skok (born 1947), American former baseball player
Janez Skok (born 1963), Slovenian slalom canoeist
Joža Skok (1931–2017), Croatian literary historian
Matevž Skok (born 1986), Slovenian handball player
Petar Skok (1881–1956), Croatian linguist
Viacheslav Skok (born 1946), Russian water polo player

References

See also
 

Slovene-language surnames
Croatian surnames
Belarusian-language surnames
Ukrainian-language surnames
Russian-language surnames
Surnames from nicknames